The Nyishi community is the largest ethnic group in Arunachal Pradesh in north-eastern India. In Nyishi, Nyi refers to "a human" and the word shi denotes "highland".The Nyishis are mentioned as the Daflas in the contemporary Ahom documents and consequently the British documents as well as the historians of the post-independence period used the same term for the Nyishis.This terminology is, however,not used nowadays.  They are spread across eight districts of Arunachal Pradesh: Kra Daadi, Kurung Kumey, East Kameng, West Kameng, Papum Pare, parts of Lower Subansiri, Kamle, and Pakke Kessang district. The Kurung Kumey and Kra Daadi districts have the largest concentration of Nyishi population. The Nyishis also live in the Sonitpur and North Lakhimpur districts of Assam.

Their population of around 300,000 makes them the most populous tribe of Arunachal Pradesh, closely followed by the tribes of the Adi according to 2001 census. The Nyishi language belongs to the Sino-Tibetan family, however, the origin is disputed.

Polygyny is prevalent among the Nyishi. It signifies one's social status and economical stability and also proves handy during hard times like clan wars or social huntings and various other social activities. This practice, however is  diminishing especially with the modernization and also with the spread of Christianity. They trace their descent patrilineally and are divided into several clans.

Economy 
The Nyishi are agriculturalists who practice jhum, known as rët rung-o in Nyishi, which is a form of shifting cultivation. The principal crops raised include paddy (rice), toppu (maize), mekung (cucumber), tak-yi (ginger), aeng (yams) and temi (millet),  thumpe (pumkin) perring(bean) and some leafy vegetables as their self-subsistence products . Rice is the staple food of the people, supplemented by fish, meat of various animals, edible tubers. Before a Western market economic system arrived, they used a barter system. They greatly valued the generalized reciprocity and also balance reciprocity in their economic system. A locally-made drink known as upo (the two types of upo: pone, made of rice, and polin which is made of millet) is served at every social gatherings and important events. The Nyishis are typically fond of it.  Traditional ways of preparing them include fermentation,  steaming, roasting and smoking.  Recently they have been forced to move towards a market based exchange economy.

Attire 
Traditionally, Nyishi plaited their hair and tie it neatly at the forehead with locally-made thread. A brass skewer passes horizontally through the tied hair. Cane rings were worn around the waist, arms and legs. Men wore a cane helmet surmounted with the beak of the great Indian hornbill. The usage of actual hornbill beaks is discouraged these days due to tough wildlife protection laws since the great Indian hornbill is a protected species and generally due to growing awareness among the people as well. Nowadays It is being supplemented by beaks made of cane or other materials and the entire headgear/cane helmet itself is readily available in the market for purchase. Additional decorations varied depending upon the status of the person and were symbols of manly valor.

The clothing of the men consists of two types of sleeveless shirts (letum) and with black and white stripe (pomo) made from thick cotton cloth, striped gaily with blue and red together with a mantle of cotton or wool fastened around the throat and shoulders. Strings made of beads in varying sizes and colours are also worn, mainly for decoration purposes and to show the wearer's status. They also carry a machete or dao (uryu) in Nyishi) (short sword) and a knife in a bamboo sheath that are mostly covered with animal furs. Their armament consists of a spear with an iron head, a large sword (uryu), and a bow and arrows which are tipped with poison (um-yu). During war both the chest and back are covered with shields made from sabbe buffalo hide, and over it they wear a black cloak made of indigenous fibre.

The Nyishi women generally wear a sleeveless mantle of striped or plain cloth, its upper part tucked tightly over the breast and enveloping the body from the armpits to the centre of the calves addition with different colour tops worn underneath among which red ( / ) is generally used . A ribbon is tied at the waist. A girdle consisting of metal disks, beads, and cane garters is worn at the waist. Their hair is parted in the middle, plaited and tied into a chignon just above the nape. Their ornaments include multicolored bead necklaces, brass chains, metal bells, huge brass or silver earrings and heavy bracelets of various metals.

Religion 
Nyokum is the festival celebrated by the Nyishi people, which commemorates their ancestors.

Christian missionaries began operating in Arunachal Pradesh in the 1950s; however, many of their proselytising activities were limited by the government until the 1970s. According to a 2011 survey, many of the Nyishi people have become Christian (31%), followed by Hinduism (29%), with many of the remaining still following the ancient indigenous Donyi-Poloism.

The hornbill issue 
The Nyishis, who traditionally wear cane helmets surmounted by the crest of a hornbill beak (known as pudum or padam), have considerably affected the population of this bird.

Several organizations, such as the Arunachal Wildlife and Nature Foundation and the Wildlife Trust of India, have been trying to stop the Nyishi hunting these birds in order to protect them from extinction. Nature reserves, such as the Pakke Sanctuary, are being set up to protect the birds, while artificial materials, such as fiberglass, have been introduced as an alternative to the hornbill beak in Nyishi dress.

Hornbill Nest Adoption Program(HNAB) has been going on since 2011, which is a community led conservation initiative through which local tribal villagers protect nest trees of hornbills in forests around villages on the fringe of the Pakke Tiger Reserve. The hunters from Nyishi tribe are now protectors who try to save the hornbill population, due to which hornbill populations have been doing well inside the protected area.

References

External links

Glimpses Of Arunachal Pradesh
 Nyishi Nyub Priests
North East Frontier
From a Cocoon, with Hope
Ethnologue profile, old profile

Tribes of Arunachal Pradesh
Tribes of Assam
Donyi-Polo communities
Social groups of Assam
Ethnic groups in Northeast India